Mount Dhupgarh or Dhoopgarh is the highest point in the Mahadeo Hills (Satpura Range), Madhya Pradesh, India. Located in Pachmarhi in Hoshangabad district, it has an elevation of 1,352 metres (4,429 ft). The top of the hill is a popular area to watch sunsets. Pachmarhi Hill station is located close to the peak.[

See also
Geography of Madhya Pradesh
List of mountains in India
List of mountains by elevation

References 

Mountains of Madhya Pradesh
Highest points of Indian states and union territories
Pachmarhi